Brigitte Guibal (born 15 February 1971 in  Mende, Lozère) is a French slalom canoeist who competed from the early 1990s to the early 2000s. She won the silver medal in the K1 event at the 2000 Summer Olympics in Sydney.

Guibal also won two medals at the 1997 ICF Canoe Slalom World Championships in Três Coroas with a gold in the K1 and a silver in the K1 team event. She also won a silver medal in the K1 event at the 2000 European Championships in Mezzana.

World Cup individual podiums

References
DatabaseOlympics.com profile
42-83 from Medal Winners ICF updated 2007.pdf?MenuID=Results/1107/0,Medal_winners_since_1936/1510/0 ICF medalists for Olympic and World Championships - Part 2: rest of flatwater (now sprint) and remaining canoeing disciplines: 1936-2007.

1971 births
Living people
People from Mende, Lozère
Canoeists at the 2000 Summer Olympics
French female canoeists
Olympic canoeists of France
Olympic silver medalists for France
Olympic medalists in canoeing
Medalists at the 2000 Summer Olympics
Medalists at the ICF Canoe Slalom World Championships
Sportspeople from Lozère